In Arabic onomastics ("nisbah"), Al-Britani uses the pronoun Al used in the Arabic language in conjunction with the following people:
Abu Hussain al-Britani
Umm Hussain al-Britani
Issa al-Britani
Abu-Zakariya al-Britani
Abu Sa'eed al-Britani
Abu Rumaysah al-Britani

Nisbas